Windsor and Maidenhead was a county constituency in the Royal Borough of Windsor and Maidenhead in Berkshire. It returned one Member of Parliament (MP) to the House of Commons of the Parliament of the United Kingdom.

The constituency was created at the February 1974 general election and abolished at the 1997 general election, when it was replaced by the new separate constituencies of Windsor and Maidenhead.

History
The constituency was formed to replace the existing County Constituency of Windsor, with no changes to its composition.

For the 1983 general election, the boundaries were adjusted to reflect the changes to local authorities under the Local Government Act 1972. The constituency gained the small town comprising the former Urban District of Eton which had been transferred from Buckinghamshire to the Royal Borough of Windsor and Maidenhead in Berkshire by the Local Government Act and was previously part of the abolished Borough Constituency of Eton and Slough.  The area comprising the former Rural District of Windsor, including Old Windsor and Sunninghill, was transferred to the new County Constituency of East Berkshire.

In order to effect an increase in Berkshire's representation from 7 to 8 MPs in accordance with the Fourth Periodic Review of Westminster Constituencies, the Windsor and Maidenhead constituency was abolished in 1997 and two separate constituencies of Maidenhead and Windsor were created. The majority of the electorate in the abolished constituency, including Maidenhead, Bisham and Cookham was transferred to the Maidenhead constituency, with Windsor, Eton and Bray added to the recreated Windsor constituency.

Boundaries
1974–1983: The Royal Borough of New Windsor, the Municipal Borough of Maidenhead, and the Rural Districts of Cookham and Windsor.

1983–1997: The Royal Borough of Windsor and Maidenhead wards of Belmont, Bisham and Cookham, Boyn Hill, Bray, Castle, Clewer North, Clewer South, Cox Green, Eton North and South, Eton West, Furze Platt, Hurley, Oldfield, Park, Pinkneys Green, St Mary's, and Trinity.

Members of Parliament

Elections

Election in the 1990s

Elections in the 1980s

Elections in the 1970s

Notes and references 

Parliamentary constituencies in Berkshire (historic)
Constituencies of the Parliament of the United Kingdom established in 1974
Constituencies of the Parliament of the United Kingdom disestablished in 1997
Politics of the Royal Borough of Windsor and Maidenhead